Strabena tamatavae is a butterfly in the family Nymphalidae. It is found on Madagascar, from the eastern part of the island to Tamatave. The habitat consists of transformed grasslands, anthropogenic environments and marshlands.

References

Strabena
Butterflies described in 1833
Endemic fauna of Madagascar
Butterflies of Africa